Sam C. S. is an Indian film music composer, producer, lyricist, and singer who predominantly works in Tamil, Telugu and Malayalam films. He debuted in Tamil with the horror film Orr Eravuu before working on the scientific thriller Ambuli.

His most notable scores include Kaithi,  Puriyatha Puthir, Vikram Vedha (and its 2022 remake), Odiyan,  Adanga Maru, Rocketry: The Nambi Effect, Iravukku Aayiram Kangal, and NOTA.

Early life
Sam was born in Munnar, Kerala, India. He lives in Cumbum, Theni, Tamil Nadu. He attended St. Aloysius Higher Secondary School in Royappan Patti, Theni. He later earned a degree in MCA and MBA from St. Joseph's College, Tiruchirappalli. He worked for a software company after his graduation.

Career
Sam's passion and drive to make music led him to quit his job and assist other music composers on scores for movies. His talent was soon discovered by movie houses, which led to an opportunity to compose music for musical thriller Mellisai, later renamed Puriyatha Puthir.

During this time, he composed jingles, which led him to meet the director duo Pushkar-Gayathri, who offered him the opportunity to score Vikram Vedha. The film's album and OST's went on to become chart toppers, earning him a solid name in the Tamil cinema industry.

Sam got his next big break in 2018 when director V. A. Shrikumar Menon offered him the much-awaited Mohanlal-starrer Odiyan to score.

Discography

As a composer

Films

Webseries

As a singer

As a lyricist
{| class="wikitable"
|-
! Year
! Movie
! Songs 
|-
|rowspan="2" | 2017
|Puriyatha Puthir || Mazhaikkulle 
|-
||Vikram Vedha||Pogatha Yennavittu 
|-
|rowspan="6" |2018
|rowspan="3|Iravukku Aayiram Kangal|Uyir Uruvaatha|-
|Yea Pa Yeppappa|-
|Yaen Penne Neeyum|-
|rowspan="2|Mr. Chandramouli
|Kallooliye
|-
|Theeraadho Vali
|-
|NOTA||Yaar Kalikku
|-
|rowspan="6" | 2019
|100||Nanba
|-
|rowspan="3"|Ispade Rajavum Idhaya Raniyum
|Kannamma
|-
|Yendi Raasathi
|-
|Yeno Penne
|-
|rowspan="2"|Gorilla
|Yaaradiyo
|-
|Chimp Song
|-
|2023||Bakasuran||Kaathama
|-
|}

Awards

Provoke Awards
 2017: Vikram Vedha (Best Upcoming Music Director)

Hello FM Awards
 2017: Vikram Vedha (Best Music Director)

Ananda Vikatan Cinema Awards
 2017: Vikram Vedha (Promising Music Director)

Vijay Awards
 2017: Vikram Vedha (Best Background Score)
IIFA Awards

 2023 : Vikram Vedha [Hindi] (Best Background Score)

References

External links
 

Tamil musicians
Tamil film score composers
Malayalam film score composers
Musicians from Madurai
Living people
Telugu film score composers
21st-century Indian composers
St Joseph's College, Tiruchirappalli alumni
1989 births